Bryotropha montana is a moth of the family Gelechiidae. It is found in central China.

References

Moths described in 1997
montana
Moths of Asia